Vlad Mihai Dragomir (born 24 April 1999) is a Romanian professional footballer who plays as a midfielder for Cypriot First Division club Pafos.

Club career
Dragomir made his senior debut for ACS Poli Timișoara on 30 August 2014, aged 15, after coming on as an 83rd-minute substitute for Alexandru Lazăr in a Liga II match with CS Mioveni.

He was signed by Premier League team Arsenal for an undisclosed fee in June 2015. In September 2016, The Guardian named him on a list of the 60 best young talents born in 1999. 

In August 2018, Dragomir announced that he would move to Italian Serie B side Perugia upon the expiration of his contract in England. On 26 January 2021, he returned to the second league with Virtus Entella.

Style of play
Dragomir can be deployed as an attacking midfielder or as a winger on either flank and is known for his vision and agility. During his time at Arsenal, manager Arsène Wenger compared his playing style to that of Jack Wilshere.

Personal life
Dragomir has an elder brother named Dragoș Nicolae.

Career statistics

Club

Honours
ACS Poli Timișoara
Liga II: 2014–15

References

External links

1999 births
Living people
Sportspeople from Timișoara
Romanian footballers
Association football midfielders
Liga II players
ACS Poli Timișoara players
Arsenal F.C. players
A.C. Perugia Calcio players
Virtus Entella players
Pafos FC players
Serie B players
Serie C players
Cypriot First Division players
Romania youth international footballers
Romania under-21 international footballers
Romanian expatriate footballers
Expatriate footballers in England
Romanian expatriate sportspeople in England
Expatriate footballers in Italy
Romanian expatriate sportspeople in Italy
Expatriate footballers in Cyprus
Romanian expatriate sportspeople in Cyprus